Józef Przybyła (29 January 1945 – 21 March 2009) was a Polish ski-jumper active from 1963 to 1971. He had some success in 1964 and competed in two Winter Olympic Games.

References 

Polish male ski jumpers
Olympic ski jumpers of Poland
Ski jumpers at the 1964 Winter Olympics
Ski jumpers at the 1968 Winter Olympics
1945 births
2009 deaths
Place of birth missing
20th-century Polish people